NGC 505 is a lenticular galaxy approximately 234 million light-years away from Earth in the constellation of Pisces. It was discovered by German astronomer Albert Marth on October 1, 1864.

See also 
 Lenticular galaxy 
 List of NGC objects (1–1000)
 Pisces

References

External links 
 
 
 SEDS
 Simbad

Lenticular galaxies
Pisces (constellation)
00505
05036
00924
+01-04-041
J01225708
Astronomical objects discovered in 1864
Discoveries by Albert Marth